The  Rolls-Royce Vulture was a British aero engine developed shortly before World War II that was designed and built by Rolls-Royce Limited. The Vulture used the unusual "X-24" configuration, whereby four cylinder blocks derived from the Rolls-Royce Peregrine were joined by a common crankshaft supported by a single crankcase. The engine was originally designed to produce around  but problems with the Vulture design meant that the engines were derated to around 1,450 to 1,550 hp in service by limiting the maximum rpm.

Although several new aircraft designs had been planned to use the Vulture, work on the engine's design ended in 1941 as Rolls-Royce concentrated on their more successful Merlin design. Another 24-cylinder engine, the Napier Sabre, proved more successful after a lengthy development period.

Design and development
The Vulture used cylinders of the same bore and stroke as the Peregrine, but the cylinder spacing was increased to accommodate a longer crankshaft, necessary for extra main bearings and wider crankpins.

The engine suffered from an abbreviated development period because Rolls-Royce suspended Vulture development in 1940 during the Battle of Britain to concentrate on the Merlin, which powered the RAF's two main fighters, the Hawker Hurricane and Supermarine Spitfire, and as a consequence the reliability of the Vulture when it entered service was very poor. Apart from delivering significantly less than the designed power, the Vulture suffered from frequent failures of the connecting rod big end bearings, which was found to be caused by a breakdown in lubrication, and also from heat dissipation problems. Rolls-Royce were initially confident that they could solve the problems, but the company's much smaller Merlin was already nearing the same power level as the Vulture's original specification, in part because of its accelerated development in 1940, and so production of the Vulture was discontinued after only 538 had been built.

Applications

The Vulture had been intended to power the Hawker Tornado interceptor but with the cancellation of Vulture development, Hawker abandoned the Tornado and concentrated on the Hawker Typhoon, which was powered by the Napier Sabre. The cancellation caused the abandonment of the Vulture-engined version of the Vickers Warwick bomber. The only aircraft type designed for the Vulture to go into production was the twin-engined Avro Manchester. When the engine reliability problems became clear, the Avro team persuaded the Air Ministry that switching to a four-Merlin version of the Manchester, which had been in development as a contingency, was preferable to retooling Avro factories to make the Handley Page Halifax. The resulting aircraft was initially called the Manchester Mark III and then subsequently renamed Avro Lancaster, going on to great success as the RAF's leading heavy bomber.

Application list

 Avro Manchester
 Blackburn B-20
 Hawker Henley
 Hawker Tornado
 Vickers Warwick

Specifications (Vulture V)

See also

References

Notes

Bibliography
 Gunston, Bill. Rolls-Royce Aero Engines. Cambridge, England. Patrick Stephens, 1989. 
 Gunston, Bill. World Encyclopedia of Aero Engines: From the Pioneers to the Present Day. 5th edition, Stroud, UK: Sutton, 2006.
 Kirby, Robert. Avro Manchester: The Legend Behind the Lancaster. Earl Shilton, Leicester, UK: Midland publishing Limited, 1995. 
 Lumsden, Alec. British Piston Aero-Engines and their Aircraft. Marlborough, Wiltshire: Airlife Publishing, 2003. .
 Rubbra, A.A. Rolls-Royce Piston Aero Engines - a Designer Remembers: Historical Series no 16: Rolls-Royce Heritage Trust, 1990. .
 White, Graham. Allied Aircraft Piston Engines of World War II: History and Development of Frontline Aircraft Piston Engines Produced by Great Britain and the United States During World War II. Warrendale, Pennsylvania: SAE International, 1995. 

Vulture
1930s aircraft piston engines
X engines